Alwi Shahab (August 31, 1936 – September 17, 2020) was an Indonesian journalist for more than 40 years who mainly focused on Jakarta's socio-cultural problems. His career began in 1960 as a journalist at the Arabian Press Board news agency in Jakarta.

In addition to journalism, Alwi also wrote essays which were compiled at least into 11 books from 2001 to 2013. Most of his books were published by Republika, where he worked since 1993. Subjects of his articles include the history of culture in Jakarta.

Early life and family
Alwi was born in Kwitang and was the oldest son of Saleh and Salma of Yemeni descent. His siblings were Latifah, Ali Shahab, Ahmad and Nur.  He was also a maternal great grandson of Habib Ali bin Abdurrahman al-Habsyi of Kwitang from his granddaughter Salma, the daughter of Maria Van Engel.

Alwi Shahab had six children from his marriage to Sjarifah Maryam Binti Abdullah Shahab: Yusuf Reza Shahab, Luli Mas'ad Shahab, Vera Farida Shahab, Viga Rogaya Shahab, Abdullah Shahab, and Fetty Fatimah Shahab.

Career
His career began in 1960 as a journalist at the Arabian Press Board news agency in Jakarta. Then in August 1963, he worked in the Antara News Agency. He has done various types of coverage when in Antara, ranging from city reporters, parliamentary police, to the economic field. In addition, for nine years (1969–1978), he had also been a Palace reporter. Alwi retired in Antara in 1993, and later joined Republika.

During his time as a journalist, Alwi Shahab often did coverage abroad. Like in 1983, he visited the Malaysia–Thailand border covering the operation to crush the Communist movement by the Malaysian Army.

Health
Alwi Shahab was diabetic since the age of 40. He died on 17 September 2020 at his home after a short period of pneumonia.

Publications

Awards
 Anugerah Budaya 2009, by the Government of Jakarta Capital Special Region through the Governor of Jakarta (December 17, 2009)
 Press Card Number One, by central committee of National Press Day (February 9, 2011)
 The Most Inspiring Print Media Rubric, by Dompet Dhuafa Republika (July 10, 2012)

References

Footnotes

Works cited

External links
 
 
 Alwi Shahab at Goodreads
 Alwi Shahab at Ensiklopedi Jakarta
 Profile at Merdeka.com

1936 births
2020 deaths
Indonesian people of Yemeni descent
Indonesian journalists
People from Jakarta